Tonara is an Israeli education and technology company that developed sheet music software of the same name. It allows music teachers to track the practice sessions of their students.

Software
Tonara software is capable of acoustic polyphonic score following, showing the musician's real-time position on the score, and turning the pages automatically as the player reaches the end of a page. The software was initially launched as an iPad application in September 2011. The application includes several free music scores, and additional music scores can be acquired through in-app purchasing. The application also enables users to record their performances, and share them with friends.

Reception
Tonara was launched as an iPad application during the TechCrunch Disrupt  conference in San Francisco, on September 12, 2011. The presentation on stage included a live string quartet and a vocal performance by Randi Zuckerberg accompanied by Piano, all of them using Tonara. After its launch, CNN included Tonara in its "Startup stars" coverage of the Battlefield, The Guardian called it "very clever"  and Wired magazine described it as “sheet music for the iPad generation… It’s pretty clear that something interactive like this will do to sheet music what Kindle did to hardback books". In October 2011, it was selected by Apple as "App of the Week" in China, Germany, Austria and Switzerland.

The first all-Tonara concert took place on November 12, 2011, in New York's Washington Square Park. Two pianists and one violinist played a complete concert repertoire including pieces by Beethoven, Brahms, Bach and Chopin, all from the Tonara store.

See also
 List of music software

References

External links
 

Software companies established in 2008
Music software
Products introduced in 2008
Software companies of Israel
2008 establishments in Israel